Sonqor (also known as Sanghūr and Sūnqūr,) is the capital city of Sonqor County, Kermanshah Province, Iran. At the 2006 census, its population was 43,184, comprising 11,377 families. It is located in the Zagros Mountains, about 90 kilometers from the province's capital city Kermanshah, and consists of two valleys; that of Gavehrud and Shajarud. Sonqor lies between the modern cities of Kangavar and Sanandaj.

Name
The name Sonqor may derive from the Turkic chief Sonqor, a vassal of the Mongols of Shiraz in Fars, who had arrived in the region with his men during the Mongol occupation of Iran.

Geography and history
In medieval Iran, Sonqor was situated on the road that ran between Dinavar and Adharbaydjan. The orientalist Vladimir Minorsky (died 1966) argued that Sonqor must have therefore corresponded approximately to the first marḥala on the stretch from Dinavar to Sisar, the name of which is recorded as al-Djarba by Al-Maqdisi (died 991) and as Kharbadjan by Ibn Khordadbeh, and was 7 farsakhs from Dinavar. The present-day distance between the ruins of Dinavar and Sonqor however, is not more than 24 kilometers. Based on these arguments, Sonqor might have therefore corresponded to the medieval district of Maybahradj as noted by Al-Baladhuri (died 892), which was separated from Dinavar under Abbasid Caliph Al-Mahdi (775–785) and joined to Sisar.

Sonqor is separated from Dinavar through the pass of Mele-mas on the "line of heights" that stretches from Dalakham to Amrula. To its northeast, the city of Sonqor is bordered by mount Pandjeh Ali; behind this mountain runs the road from Hamadan to Sanandaj. The upper tributaries of the river that runs to Dinavar also flows into Sonqor, and which ultimately joins the Gamasab river. The second edition of the Encyclopaedia of Islam notes that Sonqor, in the "strict sense", is neighboured by the (more northern) district of Kulya'i "on the upper course" of the Gawarud. The western dependencies of the Gawarud in turn are Bilawar and Niyabat. Sonqor was important in history for being located on the road followed by Muslim pilgrims who moved from Tabriz to Kermanshah. This route avoided the predominantly Kurdish territory of Sanandaj and followed a detour through Bijar (Garrus) and Sonqor, eventually reaching Kermanshah within a day's march.

Sights
The Ilkhanate-period Malek Tomb is located in the city.

Demographics
Sonqor County, in which the city of Sonqor is located, is made up of two distinct population elements. The city of Sonqor is predominantly inhabited by Turkics, whose ancestors reportedly arrived during the Mongol domination of Iran. The Turkic people of Sonqor originally speak the Sonqori dialect. The area of Sonqor County outside of Sonqor city, on the other hand, is predominantly populated by Kurds most of whom have originally been agriculturalists. The inhabitants of Sonqor city are generally trilingual in Sonqori, Kurdish and Persian.

References

Sources
 
 
 
 Website of CHHTO of Kermanshah

Populated places in Sonqor County
Cities in Kermanshah Province